Ceran St. Vrain, born Ceran de Hault de Lassus de Saint-Vrain (May 5, 1802 – October 28, 1870), was the son of a French aristocrat who immigrated to the Spanish Louisiana in the late 18th century; his mother was from St. Louis, where he was born. To gain the ability to trade, in 1831 he became a naturalized Mexican citizen in what is now the state of New Mexico. He formed a partnership with American traders William, George and Charles Bent; together they established the trading post of Bent's Fort. It was the only privately held fort in the West.

In addition to his trading post business, St. Vrain formed a business partnership with Cornelio Vigil. In 1843 the two men petitioned for and received a land grant of approximately  located in what is now southeastern Colorado. However, their plans for development of the area were halted due to the onset of the Mexican–American War, by which the United States acquired the Southwest and California.

Following the creation of the U.S. provisional government of New Mexico in 1847, St. Vrain organized a group of volunteers who fought alongside the US Army during the Taos Revolt. After the deaths of Charles and George Bent, William Bent and St. Vrain dissolved their partnership. St. Vrain settled in Mora, New Mexico Territory. There he owned saw and flourmills and was a supplier to the U.S. Army garrison at the nearby Fort Union.

Early life
Ceran St. Vrain was the son of a French aristocrat who came to the United States in the late 18th century to escape the French Revolution. His father was Jacques Marcellin Ceran de Hault de Lassus Saint-Vrain (1770-1818), the third son of Pierre de Luzière. Jacques was previously an officer in the French navy. Once in Spanish Louisiana, he becomes commander of the Spanish King's galiot La Flecha – the Arrow – and captain of militia. His mother was Marie Félicité Chauvet Dubreuil of St. Louis, Missouri, which had a predominately French population. His parents were married on April 30, 1796; they had a large family. One of Ceran's brothers was Felix St. Vrain. He became a US Indian agent and was killed in 1832 by the Sauk tribe, in what came to be known as the St. Vrain Massacre, during the Black Hawk War.

The family settled near St. Louis, Missouri, where Ceran was born on May 5, 1802. Jacques St. Vrain died insolvent in 1818. He had never recovered from the loss of his brewery, which burned down in 1813. After his father's death, Ceran became a clerk with Bernard Pratte and Company, a trading firm located in St Louis.

Into the fur trade and Bent, St. Vrain & Company

Eager for adventure, in 1824 Ceran St. Vrain persuaded Bernard Pratte to support a trading venture to Taos, New Mexico, part of newly independent Mexico. After establishing a trading post in Taos, St. Vrain travelled between Missouri and New Mexico for several years, including as far south as the Gila River (now in Southwest Arizona. He also trapped near the North Platte River in Colorado. In 1830 St. Vrain was part of a caravan of traders on their way to Taos who were intercepted near the Canadian River by Colonel José Antonio Vizcarra (sometimes referred to as "Viscarra"). According to Ceran St. Vrain, "The object in coming out so fare to meet us was to prevent Smuggling and it had the desired effeck."

In 1831, when he was living in Taos, St. Vrain became a naturalized Mexican citizen; it enable him to avoid the restrictions placed on American traders in what was then Mexican territory. He soon afterward formed a partnership with American trader William Bent. The new company was known as Bent, St. Vrain & Company; the company's trading area covered much of Wyoming, New Mexico, Kansas, and Colorado. They established company trading posts in Santa Fe and Taos, where their wagon trains made deliveries of goods shipped from Independence and Westport, Missouri. They traded cloth, glass, hardware, and tobacco for silver, furs, horses, and mules.

The Bent-St. Vrain Company built Bent's Fort, an elaborate adobe fort on the eastern Colorado plains, along the Santa Fe Trail. Bent's Fort was the only privately owned fortification in the west. It became a premier trading center and rendezvous for fur trappers. Bent's Fort has been restored and is listed on the National Register of Historic Places as a National Historic Site. Ceran St. Vrain also helped establish what is now called Old Fort Saint Vrain, along the South Platte River.

Mexican–American War and Taos Revolt
During the Taos Revolt, Ceran St. Vrain organized a volunteer force to support the U.S. re-taking of Taos, during the Mexican–American War. Joining more than 300 U.S. troops in Santa Fe, St. Vrain's 65 men set off for Taos. Along the way, they forced the retreat of some 1,500 Mexican and Indian rebels, who took refuge in a thick-walled adobe church in Taos Pueblo.

During the Siege of Pueblo de Taos, Ceran St. Vrain's "Emergency Brigade" positioned themselves between the church and the mountains. They cut off rebel forces attempting to escape the federal troops' artillery fire and frontal assault. The mounted volunteers reportedly raided the rebels and killed a total of 51 Mexicans and Taos Indians in the fierce, close-quarter fighting that followed. St. Vrain's life was saved by one of his volunteers, a New Mexican named Manuel Chaves.

Ceran St. Vrain acted as the translator in the following military trial of numerous captives taken at Taos. Fifteen men were convicted of treason and sentenced to death. They were executed in April 1847.

Grist mill and newspaper

In 1855, Ceran St. Vrain settled in Mora County, where he built a flour mill, St. Vrain's Mill. He supplied flour to Fort Union in Mora Valley, north of Las Vegas, New Mexico, and to Fort Garland in southwestern Colorado. He also began publishing one of Northern New Mexico's first English-language newspapers, the Santa Fe Gazette.

Personal life
Ceran St. Vrain had at least 6 children; historians disagree on whether Ceran was legally married to all the mothers of his children. He may have taken "country wives" among indigenous women in New Mexico; this was typical of many fur traders.

On October 28, 1870, Ceran St. Vrain died at the home of his son Vincente in Mora. More than 2,000 people attended his funeral, which included the U.S. Army garrison from Fort Union. St. Vrain was buried in what is now named St. Vrain Cemetery in Mora.

Namesakes
St. Vrain Canyon, near Lyons, Colorado, and St. Vrain Creek, which flows through into the South Platte River, and St. Vrain School district in Colorado are named after him. A street in central Colorado Springs, Colorado, St. Vrain St., is also named after him.

See also

 Kit Carson
 Thomas Tate Tobin
 Veranus of Cavaillon

Notes

Further reading
 
 
 
 Ronald K. Wetherington, Ceran St. Vrain, American Frontier Entrepreneur, Sunstone Press,

External links
 The Taos Grist Mill of Ceran St. Vrain, Taos County Historical Society

1802 births
1870 deaths
American people of French descent
History of Mora County, New Mexico
History of Taos, New Mexico
Businesspeople from St. Louis
People of Santa Fe de Nuevo Mexico
People from Taos County, New Mexico
People from Mora, New Mexico
People of the Taos Revolt
American people of the Mexican–American War
19th-century American businesspeople